Russian Empire (Russia) competed at the 1912 Summer Olympics in Stockholm, Sweden. 159 competitors took part in 62 events in 15 sports.

Medalists

Silver
 Amos Kash, Nikolai Melnitsky, Pavel Voyloshnikov and Grigori Panteleimonov — Shooting, Men's Team 30m military pistol
 Martin Klein — Wrestling, Greco-Roman middleweight

Bronze
 Mart Kuusik — Rowing, Men's single sculls
 Esper Beloselsky, Ernest Brasche, Nikolai Puschnitsky, Aleksandr Rodionov, Iosif Schomaker, Philipp Strauch and Karl Lindholm — Sailing, Men's 10m class
 Haralds Blaus — Shooting, Men's Trap

Aquatics

Swimming

Four swimmers competed for Russia at the 1912 Games. It was the nation's debut in swimming. None of the Russian swimmers took part in the semifinals of any event; Baimakov had advanced unopposed from the quarterfinals in the 400 metre breaststroke, but did not start in the semifinals.

Ranks given for each swimmer are within the heat.

 Men

Athletics

35 athletes competed for Russia. It was the second appearance of the nation in athletics, after having a single marathon runner in 1908. Aleksandr Schultz's 11th-place finish in the decathlon was Russia's best placement.

Ranks given are within that athlete's heat for running events.

Cycling

Ten cyclists represented Russia. It was the first appearance of the nation in cycling. Andrejs Apsītis was the only cyclist to finish the time trial, the only race held, placing 60th. Because only Apsītis finished the time trial, the team received no ranking in the four-man team competition.

Road cycling

Diving

A single diver represented Russia. It was Russia's debut in diving. Viktor Baranov, the sole Russian diver, did not finish the competition in the first round of the plain high diving event.

Rankings given are within the diver's heat.

Equestrian

 Dressage

 Jumping
(Team score is the sum of the top three individual scores.)

Fencing

Twenty-four fencers represented Russia. It was the second appearance of the nation in fencing, which had previously competed in 1900. Because both fencers in 1900 had been professionals, the 1912 team was the first Russian team to feature amateurs. None of the Russian fencers in 1912 advanced to the finals, though four sabrists reached the semifinals.

Football

Quarterfinals

Consolation quarterfinals

Final rank 9th place

Gymnastics

Four gymnasts represented Russia. It was the debut of the nation in gymnastics. All four of the Russian gymnasts finished in the bottom five. Russia did not send any teams in the team competitions.

Artistic

Modern pentathlon 

Russia had five competitors in the first Olympic pentathlon competition. Two of the Russians were among the ten pentathletes to retire early. The others placed 15th, 20th, and 21st among the 22 finishers.

(The scoring system was point-for-place in each of the five events, with the smallest point total winning.)

Rowing 

One rower represented Russia. It was the nation's first appearance in rowing. Kuusik advanced to the semifinals in the single sculls before being defeated, taking the bronze medal.

(Ranks given are within each crew's heat.)

Sailing 

Seventeen sailors represented Russia. It was the nation's first appearance in sailing. Neither of Russia's eight metre boats were able to score any points, but the nation's ten metre boat finished in the top three of both races; that boat lost the race-off for second place and settled for the bronze medal.

(7 points for 1st in each race, 3 points for 2nd, 1 point for 3rd. Race-off to break ties in total points if necessary for medal standings.)

Shooting 

Twenty six shooters competed for Russia. It was the first appearance of the nation in shooting. The Russian shooters won a pair of medals—a silver in the team military pistol and Blau's bronze in the trap—in their debut performance in the sport.

Tennis 

Two tennis players represented Russia at the 1912 Games. It was the nation's debut in tennis.

 Men

Wrestling

Greco-Roman
Russia was represented by 11 wrestlers at its second Olympic wrestling appearance. Klein was able to match Russia's best performance from 1908, taking the silver medal in the middleweight class. The team went a combined 17–22.

The bout between Klein and Asikainen turned out to be the last match, which lasted 11 hours and forty minutes, which is the world's longest wrestling match.

After Klein finally claimed victory, he was completely exhausted and was ruled unfit to compete in the final. Thus Johanson, whose only loss in the elimination rounds had been via a double loss to Asikainen, became the gold medalist.

Art Competitions

References

External links
Official Olympic Reports
International Olympic Committee results database

Nations at the 1912 Summer Olympics
1912
Olympics
Sport in the Russian Empire